Wood River Township may refer to one of the following places in the United States:

 Wood River Township, Madison County, Illinois
 Wood River Township, Custer County, Nebraska
 Wood River Township, Hall County, Nebraska

See also 
 Wood River (disambiguation)

Township name disambiguation pages